Patrick O'Brien may refer to:

Patrick O'Brien (artist) (born 1960), illustrator and author of children's books
Patrick O'Brien (Australian politician) (1810–1882), politician in Victoria, Australia
Patrick O'Brien (footballer, born 1875) (1875–1951), Scottish footballer
Patrick O'Brien (footballer, born 1884) (1884–?), Scottish footballer and surgeon
Patrick O'Brien (musician) (1947–2014), American musician and lutenist
Patrick O'Brien (political scientist) (1937–1998), politics professor, University of Western Australia
Patrick Cotter O'Brien (1760–1806), the tallest person alive in his lifetime
Patrick Joseph O'Brien (1835–1911), Member of Parliament for North Tipperary, 1885–1906
Patrick K. O'Brien (born 1932), British academic and historian
Patrick Thomas O'Brien (born 1951), American actor
Sir Patrick O'Brien, 2nd Baronet (1823–1895), Irish politician
Pat O'Brien (Irish politician) (Patrick O'Brien, c. 1847–1917), Irish Nationalist MP in the United Kingdom Parliament

See also
Pat O'Brien (disambiguation)
Patrick O'Brian (1914–2000), English novelist and translator
Paddy O'Brien (disambiguation)